Edward William Smyrk (1 May 1882 – 14 August 1962) was a New Zealand cricketer who played first-class cricket for Hawke's Bay and Wellington from 1910 to 1920.

Smyrk was a spin bowler, useful lower-order batsman and fine fieldsman. His best first-class bowling figures were 4 for 45 in his last match, for Wellington against Hawke's Bay in 1920. 

Smyrk served as a sapper with the Samoa Expeditionary Force in the Occupation of German Samoa in 1914. He returned to New Zealand in March 1915 and married Jessie Arnold in Napier on 7 April.

References

External links
 

1882 births
1962 deaths
People from Reefton
New Zealand cricketers 
Hawke's Bay cricketers
Wellington cricketers
New Zealand military personnel of World War I
Sportspeople from the West Coast, New Zealand